Badminton at the 2006 South Asian Games was held in Sugathadasa Indoor Stadium in Colombo, Sri Lanka between 16 and 22 August 2006. The badminton programme in 2006 included men's and women's singles competitions; men's, women's and mixed doubles competitions along with men's and women's team events.

Medal summary

Medal table

Medalists 
The following players who won medals at the Games.

Results

Men's singles

Women's singles

Men's doubles

Women's doubles

Mixed doubles

References

External links 
 Individual semi-final results at pdfs.island.lk

2006 South Asian Games
2006
South Asian Games
Badminton tournaments in Sri Lanka